Stefan Thurner (born 1969) is an Austrian physicist and complexity researcher. He has been professor for Science of Complex Systems at the Medical University of Vienna since 2009, external professor at the Santa Fe Institute since 2007, and guest professor at the Nanyang Technological University in Singapore since 2016. 

He promoted the foundation of the Complexity Science Hub Vienna and has been its president since 2015. The CSH Vienna is a research co-operation of six Austrian universities (Medical University of Vienna, TU Wien, Graz University of Technology, Vienna University of Economics and Business, Danube University Krems, University of Veterinary Medicine Vienna) and the Central European University, three research institutions (AIT Austrian Institute of Technology, International Institute for Applied Systems Analysis IIASA, Institute of Molecular Biotechnology IMBA), and the Austrian Economic Chambers, with the aim to promote Big Data and complexity research in Austria.

Stefan Thurner's research areas are the foundations of complex systems, systemic risk, network medicine, computational social sciences, and financial crisis.

In 2018, Stefan Thurner was awarded "Scientist of the year 2017" in Austria.

Selected publications

Books 

2018: S. Thurner, R. Hanel, P. Klimek: Introduction to the Theory of Complex Systems, Oxford University Press, Oxford 2018, 
 2012: S. Thurner, H. Meyer-Ortmanns: Principles of evolution: from the Planck epoch to complex multicellular life. Springer, Berlin/ Heidelberg 2011, 
2012: S. Thurner: Systemic financial risk, Steinbeis/OECD Publishing, Stuttgart/ Paris,

Journal articles and book chapters 

 S. Thurner, The Creative Destruction of Evolution, in: S. Sim, B. Seet (Eds.), “Sydney Brenner’s 10-on-10: The Chronicles of Evolution”, Wildtype Books, 
 S. Thurner, P. Klimek, S. Aichberger: Disentangling genetic and environmental risk factors for individual diseases from multiplex comorbidity networks. In: Scientific Reports. 6, 2016, S. 39658, doi:10.1038/srep39658
 S. Poledna, S. Thurner, : Elimination of systemic risk in financial networks by means of a systemic risk transaction tax. In: Quantitative Finance. 16, 2016, S. 1469–7696. doi:10.1080/14697688.2016.115614
 S. Thurner, R. Hanel, M. Gell-Mann: How multiplicity of random processes determines entropy and the derivation of the maximum entropy principle for complex systems. In: Proceedings of the National Academy of Sciences USA. 111, 2014, S. 6905–6910. doi:10.1073/pnas.1406071111
 S. Thurner, J. Doyne Farmer, J. Geanakoplos: Leverage causes fat tails and clustered volatility. In: Quantitative Finance. 12, 2012, S. 695–707. doi:10.1080/14697688.2012.674301

References 

1969 births
Living people
21st-century Austrian physicists
Complex systems scientists
20th-century Austrian  physicists